Busco Un Pueblo (English: I am Searching for A City) is the thirteenth studio album by Puerto Rican-American salsa singer-songwriter Víctor Manuelle released on November 21, 2011 on Sony Music. It contains two singles. "Si Tu Me Besas" was released on October 9, 2011 as the first official single and "Ella Lo Que Quiere Es Salsa" was released on January 21, 2012, it features Voltio and Jowell & Randy. A deluxe edition was released on January 24, 2012 featuring five bonus tracks. The Album Cover is a reference to the famous Uncle Sam poster.

Track listing

Charts

Weekly charts

Year-end charts

Certifications

References

2011 albums
Víctor Manuelle albums
Spanish-language albums